The women's 200 metre freestyle event at the 2010 Asian Games took place on 13 November 2010 at Guangzhou Aoti Aquatics Centre.

There were 15 competitors from 8 countries who took part in this event. Two heats were held, the heat in which a swimmer competed did not formally matter for advancement, as the swimmers with the top eight times from the entire field qualified for the finals.

Zhu Qianwei and Tang Yi from China won the gold and silver medal respectively, Japanese swimmer Hanae Ito won the bronze medal.

Schedule
All times are China Standard Time (UTC+08:00)

Records

Results

Heats

Final

References

 16th Asian Games Results

External links 
 Women's 200m Freestyle Heats Official Website
 Women's 200m Freestyle Ev.No.1 Final Official Website

Swimming at the 2010 Asian Games